Athlon II is a family of AMD multi-core 45 nm central processing units, which is aimed at the budget to mid-range market and is a complementary product lineup to the Phenom II.

Features
The Athlon II series is based on the AMD K10 architecture and derived from the Phenom II series. However, unlike its Phenom siblings, it does not contain any L3 Cache. There are two principal Athlon II dies: the dual-core Regor die with 1 MB L2 Cache per core and the four-core Propus with 512 KB per core. Regor is a native dual-core design with lower TDP and additional L2 to offset the removal of L3 cache. The Athlon II x2 200e-220 chips have less L2 cache than the rest of the Regor line. The triple-core Rana is derived from the Propus quad-core design, with one core disabled. In some cases, the Phenom II Deneb die is used with disabled L3 cache and cores in the case.
Includes: AMD Direct Connect Architecture 
AMD Wide Floating Point Accelerator 
AMD Digital Media XPress 2.0 Technology 
AMD PowerNow! Technology (Cool’n’Quiet Technology) 
HyperTransport Technology (not the same as Intel Hyper-Threading Technology)

Processors with an "e" following the model number (e.g., 245e) are low-power models, typically 45W for Athlons, 65W for Phenoms. Processors with a "u" following the model number (e.g., 250u) are ultra-low voltage models.

 For a list of Athlon II processors, see: List of AMD Athlon II processors

Cores

Regor (45 nm SOI with immersion lithography)
 Two AMD K10 cores (Some are chip harvested Propus or Deneb with two cores disabled)
 L1 cache: 64 kB + 64 kB (data + instructions) per core
 L2 cache: 1024 kB per core, full-speed (512 kB per core in Athlon II X2 200e-220)
 Memory controller: dual channel DDR2-1066 MHz (AM2+), dual channel DDR3-1333 (AM3) with unganging option
 MMX, Extended 3DNow!, SSE, SSE2, SSE3, SSE4a, AMD64, Cool'n'Quiet, NX bit, AMD-V
 Socket AM3, HyperTransport with 2 GHz
 Die Size: 117 mm² 
 Power consumption (TDP): 25-65 Watts
 First release
 June 2009 (Stepping C2)
 Clock rate: 1.6 - 3.6 GHz
 Models: Athlon II X2 250u - 280

Rana (45 nm SOI with immersion lithography)
 Three AMD K10 cores chip harvested from Propus or Deneb with one core disabled
 L1 cache: 64 kB + 64 kB (data + instructions) per core
 L2 cache: 512 kB per core, full-speed
 Memory controller: dual channel DDR2-1066 MHz (AM2+), dual channel DDR3-1333 (AM3) with unganging option
 MMX, Extended 3DNow!, SSE, SSE2, SSE3, SSE4a, AMD64, Cool'n'Quiet, NX bit, AMD-V
 Socket AM3, HyperTransport with 2 GHz
 Die Size: 169 mm² 
 Power consumption (TDP): 45 Watts or 95 Watts
 First release
 October 2009 (Stepping C2)
 Clock rate: 2.2–3.4 GHz
 Models: Athlon II X3 400e - 460

Propus (45 nm SOI with immersion lithography)

 Four AMD K10 cores chip harvested from Deneb with L3 cache disabled
 L1 cache: 64 kB + 64 kB (data + instructions) per core
 L2 cache: 512 kB per core, full-speed
 Memory controller: dual channel DDR2-1066 MHz (AM2+), dual channel DDR3-1333 (AM3) with unganging option
 MMX, Extended 3DNow!, SSE, SSE2, SSE3, SSE4a, AMD64, Cool'n'Quiet, NX bit, AMD-V
 Socket AM3, HyperTransport with 2 GHz
 Die Size: 169 mm² 
 Power consumption (TDP): 45 Watts or 95 Watts
 First release
 September 2009 (Stepping C2)
 Clock rate: 2.2–3.1 GHz
 Models: Athlon II X4 600e - 645, Phenom II x4 840

See also
 List of AMD Athlon processors
 List of AMD Athlon X2 processors
 List of AMD Athlon II processors
 List of AMD Phenom processors

External links 

 AMD product website

AMD x86 microprocessors